The History of Ukrainian literature includes laws of the historical and literary process, literary genres, trends, works of individual writers, features of their style, and the importance of artistic heritage in the development of Ukrainian literature.

Ukrainian literature has a thousand-year history. Its beginnings date back to the formation of Kievan-Rus. However, even in prehistoric times (before the ninth century), the ancestors of Ukrainians had a developed oral art.

Literature of Rus 

The first outstanding written monument of Kievan Rus is the chronicle "The Tale of Past Years," which is not only a source of historical information but also a textbook of epic songs, and legends of the era of Kievan-Rus. "The Tale of Igor's Campaign" is a poetic masterpiece of ancient literature. This heroic epic absorbed the best examples of folk art of that time and became the property and pride of the whole Slavic world.

New Ukrainian literature 

At the end of the 18th century, Ivan Kotliarevsky's burlesque-travesty poem Eneida marked the emergence of the newest literary Ukrainian language and the beginning of modern Ukrainian literature. This work absorbed the pearls of Ukrainian humor, and reflected the bright folklife. The humorous and satirical tone of Kotlyarevsky's works was picked up by other writers, primarily members of the so-called Kharkiv circle (P. Gulak-Artemovsky, E. Grebenka). H. Kvitka-Osnovyanenko also belonged to the Kharkiv circle, and is the founder of Ukrainian fiction, who broke the tradition of using the Ukrainian language only in comic genres.

Ukrainian literature under Austro-Hungarian and Polish Rule

Ukrainian literature under Russian Rule

Period of the Russian Empire 
Despite the House of Romanov's colonial policy of coercive Russification of Ukraine (1863 — Valuev Circular, 1876 — Ems Ukaz), Ukrainian literature developed and achieved significant success.

In 1798, the poem Eneida by Ivan Kotliarevsky was published — it was with it that the Ukrainian literary language began. Kotliarevsky also wrote the plays in Ukrainian: "Natalka Poltavka" and "Moskal-Charivnyk."

At the beginning of the 19th century, Ukrainian literature was actively developing. Romanticism reigned in poetry at that time. The poets of the so-called "Kharkiv School of Romantics" P. Gulak-Artemovsky, M. Petrenko, V. Zabila, and others made a great contribution to the development of Ukrainian literature. The first prose works in Ukrainian were written by Hryhoriy Kvitka-Osnovyanenko: "Marusya," "Konotopska vidma," and "Saldatsky patret."

The most outstanding Ukrainian writer of the 20th century was Taras Shevchenko — poet, artist, author of prose, and dramatic works. In 1840, his collection of poems "Kobzar" was published.

Panteleimon Kulish, Marko Vovchok, Ivan Nechuy-Levytsky, Borys Hrinchenko, Mykhailo Kotsiubynsky, Lesya Ukrainka, Volodymyr Vynnychenko, Spiridon Cherkasenko, and Arkhip Teslenko made a significant contribution to the development of Ukrainian literature.

Period of the USSR 
After the revolution, the literary process was particularly dramatic and complex in Ukraine, as in the entire USSR. On the one hand, Ukrainian literature at that time was experiencing an unprecedented zenith. On a rich literary palette, various art schools, styles, and trends coexisted — from radical proletarianism, whose theorists promoted the creation of a "purely proletarian culture" by "laboratory means" (V. Blaktyny, G. Mikhaylichenko, M. Khvylvoy) to futurism (M. Semenko) and even neoclassicism, whose representatives were guided by the creation of high harmonious art based on the development of classical samples of World Literature (a group of neoclassicists led by M. Zerov).

In 1925–1928, a "literary discussion" was held — a public discussion about the ways of development, ideologies, aesthetic orientation, and objectives of the new Ukrainian Soviet literature, the place, and role of the writer in society. The discussion arose due to deep differences in understanding of the nature and purpose of artistic creativity among Ukrainian writers, and the ideological and political competition of literary organizations.

However, most of the representatives of this wave of Ukrainian revival died during the Civil War, the Holodomor of 1932-33, Red Terror, and the Bolshevik repressions of the 30s. In 1938–1954, about 240 Ukrainian writers were repressed, although many of them were supporters of the Soviet government, fought for it, and became writers after the revolution. Some of them were shot, some died in prison, and the fate of some of them remained unknown after the arrests. The poet M. Rylsky, recognized by the Soviet authorities, was arrested and spent 10 years in the camps on charges of participating in a mythical Ukrainian military organization. Ostap Vyshnya, G. Kosynka, M. Zerov, M. Kulish, Y. Pluzhnyk, and M. Semenko were shot. M. Khvylovy, who tried to save many comrades, committed suicide.  The Experimental Theater "Berezil" was also banned, and its head — the world-famous director Les Kurbas - was arrested and shot. This generation of writers in the history of Ukrainian literature has become known as — "Executed Renaissance."

Despite the rigid framework of the Soviet-style style of socialist realism, Ukrainian writers managed to create literature that has not lost its relevance today. These are, first of all, works by P. Tychyna, M. Rylsky, V. Sosiura, O. Dovzhenko, O. Honchar and others.

Contemporary Ukrainian literature 

Modern Ukrainian prose is the Ukrainian literature of recent decades, created by modern writers. the scientific literature does not specify exactly from what point Ukrainian literature should be considered modern. However, the concept of "modern Ukrainian literature" is most often understood as a set of works of fiction — written from the time of Ukraine's independence in 1991 to the present. This distinction is due to the disappearance after 1991 of the generally binding style of socialist realism for artists of the USSR and the abolition of Soviet censorship. Fundamental changes in Ukrainian literature occurred during the years of Perestroika (1985) and especially after the Chernobyl disaster (1986). Some researchers believe that modern Ukrainian literature begins in the 1970s after the generation of the Sixties.

See also 
 Ukrainian literature
 Executed Renaissance
 Contemporary Ukrainian literature
 Samizdat
 Ukrainian Book Institute
 The Forest Song
 Lesya Ukrainka
 Taras Shevchenko

References

Sources 
 В. М. Лесин, О. С. Пулинець Словник літературознавчих термінів. «Радянська школа», Київ, 1971
 http://litopys.org.ua/chyzh/chy02.htm
 Історія України / Керівник авт. Ю.Зайцев. Вид.2-ге зі змінами. //- Львів: Світ, 1998. — с 207 −212
 Котляр М., Кульчицький С. Шляхами віків: Довідник з історії України// — К.: Україна,1993 — с 108–109.
 Український самвидав: літературна критика та публіцистика (1960-і — початок 1970-х років): Монографія / О. Є. Обертас. — К. : Смолоскип, 2010. — 300 c.
 Українська література в контексті соціокультурних перетворень ХХ століття: монографія / Т. Л. Шептицька ; М-во освіти і науки України, Київ. нац. ун-т ім. Т. Шевченка. — Київ: ВПЦ «Київ. ун-т», 2013. — 151 с.

Bibliography 
 Історія української літератури: у 12 т. / редкол. : Віталій Дончик (голова) [та ін.] ; Нац. акад наук України, Ін-т літ. ім. Т. Г. Шевченка НАН України. — Київ: Наукова думка, 2013 . — .
 Т. 1 : Давня література (Х — перша половина ХVI ст.) / [Юрій Пелешенко та ін.] ; наук. ред. : Юрій Пелешенко, Микола Сулима ; передм. Миколи Жулинського. — 2013. — 838 с. : іл. — 300 пр. —  (т. 1): Т. 2 : Давня література (друга половина XVI—XVIII ст.) / [М. Сулима та ін.] ; наук. ред:. Віра Сулима, Микола Сулима. — 2014. — 838, [33] с. : іл. — 300 пр. —  (т. 2): Т. 3 : Кін. XVIII — кін. 30-х років ХІХ ст. / 2016. — 752 c.
 Т. 4. Тарас Шевченко / І. М. Дзюба; ред.: М. Г. Жулинський. — 2014. — 781, [48] c.
 Історія української літератури ХІ — XVIII ст. : навч. посіб. / П. В. Білоус. — К. : Акад., 2009. — 424 c. — (Альма-матер). — Бібліогр.: с. 416–423.
 Історія української літератури кінця XVIII — 60-x років XIX століття: підручник / Л. М. Задорожна; Київ. нац. ун-т ім. Т. Шевченка. — 2-ге вид., переробл. та доповн. — К., 2008. — 479 c. — Бібліогр.: 87 назв.
 Історія української літератури ХІХ ст. : Підруч. для студ. філол. спец. вищ. навч. закл.: У 2-х кн. Кн. 1 / М. Г. Жулинський, М. П. Бондар, О. І. Гончар, Б. А. Деркач, Ю. О. Івакін, І. В. Лімборський, Л. З. Мороз, Є. К. Нахлік, В. Л. Смілянська, П. М. Федченко. — К. : Либідь, 2005. — 656 c. — Бібліогр.: с. 627–639.
 Історія української літератури ХIХ століття: Підруч. для студ. філол. спец. ВНЗ: У 2-х кн. Кн. 2 / М. Г. Жулинський, М. П. Бондар, Т. І. Гундорова, Л. О. Гаєвська, М. П. Кодак. — К. : Либідь, 2006. — 711 c. — Бібліогр.: с. 686–698.
 Українська література XX століття: моногр. / Микола Ткачук. — Тернопіль: Медобори, 2014. — 608 с.
 Історія української літератури ХХ — поч. ХХІ ст. : навч. посіб. : у 3 т. Т. 1 / В. І. Кузьменко, Гарачковська Оксана Олександрівна, М. В. Кузьменко, Т. В. Бикова, В. С. Брюховецький. — Київ: Академвидав, 2013. — 588 c.

History of Ukrainian literature
Ukrainian literature
Ukrainian studies